Biraj Adhikari is an Indian politician in Sikkim.

Political career
Biraj Adhikari was the general secretary of the Sikkim Pradesh Congress Committee (SPCC. Sikkim branch of Indian National Congress (INC)) which was led by Nar Bahadur Bhandari. In 2004, as the candidate of INC, Adhikari contested the sole Lok Sabha seat from Sikkim. But he was beaten by the candidate of the ruling party Sikkim Democratic Front (SDF) and became a runner-up candidate.

In May 2006, because of discontent with Bhandari's leadership, Biraji Adhikari seceded from SPCC. He joined Sikkim Himali Rajya Parishad (SHRP) as the spokesperson of it.

On 10 October 2008, Biraj Adhikari seceded from SHRP, and established the new party, Sikkim National People’s Party (SNPP) for fighting with SDF. Adhikari was elected president, Tseten Dorjee Lepcha was elected to working president, and Delay Namgyal Barfungpa was elected  treasurer.

In the Sikkim Legislative Assembly election of 2009, Biraj Adhikari contested from 2 constituencies (Rhenock and Chujachen), Tseten Dorjee Lepcha contested from Djongu constituency and Barfungpa contested from Gangtok constituency. However, SNPP could not be registered in the List of Political Parties of Election Commission of India (ECI) before the election period, so Adhikari and other SNPP candidates had to run as independent candidates. As the result, they received 6.26% votes (Tseten Dorjee Lepcha in Djongu) or less in each constituency.

In 2014 Sikkim Legislative Assembly election Biraj Adhikari announced that SNPP did not contest this election. He also appealed voters to be politically conscious, points out "None of the Above" (NOTA) option.

In January 2018, Biraj Adhikari announced that SNPP will contest the Sikkim Legislative Assembly Election 2019. However, in August 2018 Adhikari resigned from the president and seceded from SNPP. He transferred to Hamro Sikkim Party (HSP) which was led by Bhaichung Bhutia. Adhikari was appointed to the spokesperson of HSP. Delay Namgyal Barfungpa did not follow Adhikari, and Barfungpa was elected to the new SNPP president by party members.

In both 2019 Sikkim Lok Sabha Election and 2019 Sikkim Legislative Assembly election (Rhenock constituency), Biraj Adhikari stood as the candidates of HSP. But he lost in both elections by less than 1% votes.

Electoral record 
 Sikkim Legislative Assembly election

 Lok Sabah election, Sikkim

References

Living people
Sikkim politicians
People from Gangtok district
Indian National Congress politicians from Sikkim
Year of birth missing (living people)